Artem Baranovskyi (born 17 March 1990) is a Ukrainian professional footballer who plays as a defender for FC Akzhayik.

Career
Baranovskyi is a product of the youth team systems of FC Metalurh Donetsk and UOR Donetsk. He made his senior professional debut for FC Metalurh entering as a second-half substitute against SC Tavriya Simferopol on 24 April 2011, in the Ukrainian Premier League.

He played for FC Stal Dniprodzerzhynsk in the Ukrainian Premier League.

In March 2017, having been on trial with the club, Baranovskyi signed a one-year contract with FC Istiklol. Istiklol announced on 27 January 2019, Baranovskyi's contract had not been renewed after it ended at the end of the 2018 season.

On 13 February 2019, Baranovskyi signed a one-year contract with Shakhter Karagandy.

On 9 September 2020, Baranovskyi signed for FC Kyzylzhar.

On 4 March 2021, Baranovskyi signed for FC Akzhayik.

Career statistics

Club

Honours

Club
 Istiklol
 Tajik League (2): 2017, 2018
 Tajik Supercup (1): 2018

References

External links
Profile at FFU official site (Ukr)

1990 births
Living people
People from Krasnohorivka
Ukrainian footballers
FC Tytan Donetsk players
FC Metalurh Donetsk players
FC Stal Kamianske players
FC Olimpik Donetsk players
FC Istiklol players
Ukrainian Premier League players
Ukrainian expatriate footballers
Expatriate footballers in Tajikistan
Association football defenders
Ukrainian expatriate sportspeople in Tajikistan
Expatriate footballers in Kazakhstan
Ukrainian expatriate sportspeople in Kazakhstan
Expatriate footballers in Uzbekistan
Ukrainian expatriate sportspeople in Uzbekistan
FC Shakhter Karagandy players
PFK Nurafshon players
FC Kyzylzhar players
FC Akzhayik players
Tajikistan Higher League players
Ukrainian Second League players
Sportspeople from Donetsk Oblast